A list of films produced in Italy in 1919 (see 1919 in film):

External links
 Italian films of 1919 at the Internet Movie Database

Italian
1919
Films